The Sweden and Norway joint edition of Big Brother is a reality show shown on Kanal 5 in Sweden, and FEM in Norway, in which a number of contestants live in an isolated house trying to avoid being evicted by the public with the aim of winning a large cash prize at the end of the run. It is based on the Big Brother series produced by Endemol.

From 2000 on, seasons of Big Brother were shown in both Norway and Sweden and in both countries the show enjoyed very high ratings, so high that eventually the production teams of both began thinking about joining to make one Big Brother show for both countries. In 2005, they joined forces.

The 2006 season was also a co-production between Norwegian and Swedish Big Brother. For this season Adam Alsing left the show, and Hannah Rosander took over as the Swedish host. There was also a Big Brother Exchange twist with Big Brother Thailand as well. Following the second season in 2006 the show was cancelled in both Sweden and Norway.

On 31 August 2014 the third joint season of Big Brother between Norway and Sweden premiered on Kanal 9 in Sweden and FEM in Norway.

First joint season
The 2005 season was a co-production with Big Brother Norway, in which nine Swedes and nine Norwegians were put together in the house. The live shows were hosted by Adam Alsing as well as the Norwegian host Brita Møystad Engseth.

In the first season of the show the contestants were initially divided into two houses depending on which country they came from but following the first eviction the houses were joined but contestants were still divided into two teams. The team format was an on and off part of the show as some weeks contestants could win individual immunity from eviction through competitions and those who did not win could nominate anyone from either team and could also be nominated from either team.

Towards the end of the series, for one week the public got to nominate and the housemates had to vote evict, they evicted Tina. In another twist, a week later the public were given the choice of which one of three evicted housemates could return to the house and in a surprising result, Tina was voted back into the house. A few weeks later, Carl and Kenneth were fake evicted to a secret room in the house and were both nominated, Kenneth was evicted. Just a few days later, and Carl returned to the house. In the end, it was Britt, the 22-year-old non-original housemate from Norway who won with 47% of the vote.

Famous faces from that year was Swede Elita Löfblad who went on to get a successful modeling career, and Aylar Lie who was a guest star on the show.

Housemates

Nominations table

Notes

Second joint season
The second season ditched the team format of the first season and went back to the original format of the show. The first twist of the season was announced on launch night, the twist was that by weeks end six of the twelve original male housemates would be evicted and it was up to the female housemates to decide which six would go. What the housemates didn't know was that the six would not be evicted but would be moved to a room next door to the house and that the person who stayed in the room the longest would return to the house. The rules to the last part of the twist was soon changed as on day 30 Daniel O, Max, and Per had yet to leave the room, a competition was held to determine who would return to the house. Unlike the first season when there were never any housemates nominated by Big brother, there were several housemates who were nominated by Big brother due to violence, rule breaking, discussing nominations, and several unknown reasons. In the end it was Jessica from Sweden who won 1,000,000 SEK with 44% of the vote.

Broadcasting: Kanal 5 19:00-20:00 (Monday-Friday); FEM 20:00-21:00 (Monday-Friday); Liveshows 21:00-22:30 (Sunday)

Housemates

Nominations table

Third joint season

Season 3 of the joint Big Brother between Sweden and Norway premiered on 31 August 2014. It was broadcast on Kanal 9 in Sweden and FEM in Norway. Hosts were Adam Alsing and Pia Lykke.

References

See also
Aylar Lie

Sweden and Norway
2005 Norwegian television series debuts
2005 Swedish television series debuts
2006 Norwegian television series endings
2006 Swedish television series endings
2000s Swedish television series
2000s Norwegian television series
Norwegian reality television series
Swedish reality television series